The Juno Awards (stylized as JUNOS), or simply known as the Junos, are awards presented by the Canadian Academy of Recording Arts and Sciences to recognize outstanding achievements in the music industry. The first Juno Awards ceremony was held on February 23, 1970 to honor the musical accomplishments of performers for the year 1969. New members of the Canadian Music Hall of Fame are also inducted as part of the awards ceremonies.

History
The Juno Awards are named in honour of Pierre Juneau, the first president of the Canadian Radio-television and Telecommunications Commission (CRTC) and former president of the Canadian Broadcasting Corporation (CBC).

1970s
In 1964 RPM magazine began polling its readers to determine which artists and groups they considered the best in Canada. RPM announced the results of these polls each December. There were no formal award ceremonies.

Record label owner Stan Klees met with RPM founder Walt Grealis to plan a formal music industry awards ceremony. Instead of merely publishing the award results in RPM, presentations would be made at a physical venue. The first ceremony was the Gold Leaf Awards which took place on 23 February 1970 in Toronto, Ontario.

Later that year RPM invited its readers to suggest a new name for these awards. The name "Juneau" was submitted, in honour of Pierre Juneau, the first head of the CRTC. Juneau was instrumental in establishing Canadian content regulations for broadcasters to promote Canadian musicians. That name became shortened to Juno and by 1971, the awards ceremonies were referred to as the "Juno Awards".

From 1970 to 1973, RPM announced the winners before the awards night. From 1974, the award winners were not made public until the Juno ceremonies. Music industry representatives formed an advisory committee for the Junos in 1974 which became the Canadian Music Awards Association the following year. This organisation assumed full management and operation of the Juno Awards from 1977 and became the Canadian Academy of Recording Arts and Sciences (CARAS).

The Junos were first televised across Canada in 1975 on CBC Television. Primary ceremonies continued to be broadcast on CBC until 2001, moving to CTV Television Network (CTV) in 2002. CBC broadcast the Juno Awards of 2018.

The Canadian Music Hall of Fame was introduced in 1978. In 1979 the stauette's name was officially changed from RPM Annual Gold Leaf Award to Juno Award, and Canada's Prime Minister Pierre Trudeau was a presenter.

1980s

Joni Mitchell was inducted into the Canadian Music Hall of Fame by Pierre Trudeau in 1982.

Initially, the awards were presented during the early part of each year. In 1984, organisers postponed that year's awards until December. CARAS maintained a late-year scheduling until January 1988 when it noted the declining viewership of the Juno broadcasts and reverted to an early year awards schedule. CARAS postponed that year's Juno Awards until 12 March 1989, so there was no ceremony in the 1988 calendar year.

1990s
In 1991, the awards were hosted in Vancouver, the first time the Juno ceremonies were conducted outside Toronto. That year also marked the introduction of a category for rap recordings.

For the first time the 1995 Awards, held in Hamilton's Copps Coliseum, were open to the public. This marked the 25th anniversary of the Junos.

In 1996 the four-CD, 77-song box set Oh What a Feeling: A Vital Collection of Canadian Music and a book were released to mark the 25th anniversary of the Juno Awards. The box set featured popular songs by Canadian artists from the 1960s to 1990s sold over one million copies and was certified diamond. In 2001, a second four-CD box set was released to celebrate the 30th anniversary of the awards. In 2006, a third box set was released to celebrate the 35th anniversary which was certified platinum in Canada.

2000s

CARAS transferred the broadcast rights to the Juno Awards from CBC to CTV for the 2002 ceremonies. 2006 marked the first time the Junos were broadcast internationally through MTV2 in the United States and several affiliated MTV channels in other nations. The telecast of the 2006 Juno Awards was available to approximately 250 million people.

The Allan Waters Humanitarian Award honouring media icon Allan Waters was inaugurated in 2006. The first artist to be given this honour was Bruce Cockburn.

At the 2007 ceremony, host Nelly Furtado made Juno history by being the first nominee with multiple nominations to win every award for which she was nominated. These included the two most prestigious honours, Album of the Year and Artist of the Year.

On 18 April 2017, CARAS president Allan Reid announced that the ceremonies would return to CBC for the first time since 2002, for at least the next six years. He said he wanted to collaborate with the CBC to bolster a year-round presence for the Juno Awards as a platform for promoting Canadian music.

The 2020 event was canceled because of the COVID-19 pandemic in Canada, but later replaced by an online ceremony on June 29.

Nomination process

Specific award categories and their descriptions vary from year to year reflecting changes and developments in the music industry. In 1964 there were 16 categories, and in 2017 there were 42. Judging panels change each year. They include people from different areas of the music industry and regions of the country. An advisory committee oversees each category to ensure that all the submissions meet the required criteria.

The nominations for each year's Junos are based on an eligibility period which lasts for 13 to 14 months, ending on the mid-November prior to the awards ceremony. For example, the eligibility period of the 2010 Juno Awards was from 1 September 2008 to 13 November 2009. Musicians or their representatives submit music released during the eligibility period to CARAS, designated for the appropriate nomination categories. Nominations other than for the International Album of the Year may only be awarded to Canadians who have lived in Canada during the last six months of the eligibility period, and are deemed Canadian by birth, passport or immigration status.

Following the close of the eligibility period, CARAS conducts an initial vote by its members to establish the list of nominees in most categories. Sales figures determined the nominees for Album of the Year and International Album of the Year. Sales along with a jury vote determine the New Artist of the Year, New Group of the Year, Rock Album of the Year and Pop Album of the Year. Sales and a CARAS member vote determine the nominations for Artist of the Year and Group of the Year.

After the nominees list is published, another voting round is conducted to determine the winners of most categories. Voting for the Juno Fan Choice Award is open to the public, while voting on general categories is limited to CARAS members. Winners in genre-specific or specialty categories are determined by specially appointed CARAS juries. As of 2010, ballots are audited by the major accounting company PricewaterhouseCoopers.

Trophy

Stan Klees developed the first Juno trophies for the inaugural presentations in 1970. When CBC televised the ceremonies in 1975, the award was constructed from acrylic instead of wood while retaining a metronome shape. The trophy was given minor modifications in succeeding years. These included a reduction in size for ease of handling, and changes to the inlay design such as a special 1996 emblem to signify the 25th anniversary.

In 2000 following criticism from producers that the existing award trophy did not have an attractive television appearance, CARAS commissioned a redesigned award from Stoney Creek, Ontario, artist Shirley Elford. After reviewing three designs, two of which were patterned after the existing trophy, a new trophy design was selected featuring a glass human figure surrounded by a nickel-coated spiral symbolic of a musical staff on an aluminum base. A few display statuettes were circulated for presentation during the ceremonies. Within months, winners received their personalized and individually made trophies from Elford.

In October 2010, CARAS unveiled a new award design to be used from 2011 on. Elford had developed cancer and was no longer able to produce individual Juno trophies. The new design, manufactured by Crystal Sensations of Markham, ON, featured a solid crystal tower containing a subsurface laser engraving depicting a spiral-wrapped human figure resembling the previous statuette. Elford died in November 2011.

Ceremonies
The Juno Awards events were not conducted outside Toronto until 1991. Since then, the ceremonies have been hosted throughout Canada, reaching both coasts. The provinces of New Brunswick, Prince Edward Island, Quebec, and the Territories, have yet to play host to the Junos. In recent years, the various locations often host a number of supporting events and festivals surrounding the awards.

Live performances 
Beginning in 1975 when the CBC began to televise the Junos live performances were featured throughout the show. The Canadian Music Hall of Fame was introduced in 1978. These are the performers who appeared during the show and those who were inducted into the Canadian Music Hall of fame.

Award categories

The "General Field" are awards which are not restricted by music genre.

The Album of the Year award is presented to the performer, featured artists, songwriter(s), and/or production team of a full album if other than the performer.
 The Single of the Year award is presented to the songwriter(s) of a single song.
 The Breakthrough Artist of the Year and Breakthrough Group of the Year awards are presented to a promising breakthrough performer and performers who in the eligibility year releases the first recording that establishes their public identity (which is not necessarily their first proper release).
 Artist of the Year
 Group of the Year
 Fan Choice Award

Other awards are given for performance and production in specific genres and for other contributions such as artwork and video. Special awards are also given for longer-lasting contributions to the music industry.

Award names have changed through the years, most notably the switch in 2003 from the phrase "Best..." to " ... of the year".

Genre-specific fields 
Pop

 Pop Album of the Year

Dance/Electronic

 Dance Recording of the Year
 Underground Dance Single of the Year
 Electronic Album of the Year

Contemporary Instrumental

 Instrumental Album of the Year

Rock

 Rock Album of the Year
 Metal/Hard Music Album of the Year

Alternative

 Alternative Album of the Year
 Adult Alternative Album of the Year

R&B

 Traditional R&B/Soul Recording of the Year
 Contemporary R&B/Soul Recording of the Year

Rap

 Rap Single of the Year
 Rap Album/EP of the Year

Country

 Country Album of the Year

Jazz

 Jazz Album of the Year – Solo
 Jazz Album of the Year – Group
 Vocal Jazz Album of the Year

Gospel/Contemporary Christian Music

 Contemporary Christian/Gospel Album of the Year

Canadian Roots

 Contemporary Roots Album of the Year
 Traditional Roots Album of the Year
 Blues Album of the Year

Reggae

 Reggae Recording of the Year

Global Music

 Global Music Album of the Year

Children's

 Children's Album of the Year

Comedy

 Comedy Album of the Year

Composing

 Instrumental Album of the Year

Engineering Field

 Recording Engineer of the Year

Production Field

 Producer of the Year

Songwriting

 Songwriter of the Year

Classical

 Classical Composition of the Year
 Classical Album of the Year – Solo
 Classical Album of the Year – Small Ensemble
 Classical Album of the Year – Large Ensemble

Music Video/Film

 Video of the Year

Francophone

 Francophone Album of the Year

Indigenous

 Traditional Indigenous Artist of the Year
 Contemporary Indigenous Artist of the Year

International

 International Album of the Year

Other

 Album Artwork of the Year
 MusiCounts Teacher of the Year

Former Categories 
 Juno International Achievement Award - awarded from 1992 to 2000
 Juno Award for International Entertainer of the Year - awarded from 1989 to 1993
 Juno Award for Best Selling Single - awarded from 1975 to 1993
 Juno Award for Music DVD of the Year - awarded from 2004 to 2013 - discontinued in 2014
 Juno Award for Traditional Jazz Album of the Year - awarded from 1977 to 2014 - discontinued in 2015
 Juno Award for Roots & Traditional Album of the Year – Solo - awarded between 1989 and 2015
 Juno Award for Roots & Traditional Album of the Year – Group - awarded between 1989 and 2015

Beginning with the 2016 ceremony, two new awards categories—Contemporary Roots Album of the Year and Traditional Roots Album of the Year—were introduced to "ensure two genres of music are not competing against each other in the same category".

Since 2015, Breakthrough Artist of the Year, Album of the Year, and Fan Choice Award are the only categories that are presented at every broadcast.

The awards for Breakthrough Artist of the Year and Breakthrough Group of the Year are customarily presented by the Minister of Canadian Heritage.

Criticism
The Juno Awards have received criticism from several Canadian artists.

Rascalz
In 1998, the Rascalz album Cash Crop was nominated for Best Rap Recording. Due to Canadian hip hop's limited commercial notability, the rap award had never been presented during the main Juno ceremony, instead being relegated to the non-televised technical awards ceremony during the previous evening.

This fact had previously been criticized for creating a barrier to the commercial visibility of Canadian hip hop. Rascalz, however, alleged that racism was a factor in the award's disadvantageous scheduling, and became the first Canadian hip hop group to explicitly decline the award on that basis.

Their move sparked considerable media debate about the state of Canadian hip hop. As a result of the controversy, the Juno Awards moved the rap category to the main ceremony the following year.

Matthew Good
Matthew Good has won four Juno Awards during his career, but has not attended the ceremonies in any of the years he won. In 2009, he criticized the awards for not promoting Canadian music at the grassroots level, saying, "When it ... isn't kind of this weekend when the Canadian music industry pretends that it's ... not just marketing warehouses for the United States, then sure, I'll be a part of it."

Kardinal Offishall
At the 2006 Juno Awards, Kardinal Offishall stated that he would not attend the Junos anymore. "I'm not going to be the Juno's monkey no more, I'm not coming back any more." Offishall cited Canadian hip-hop's low profile at that year's awards as the catalyst for his decision. Offishall further stated, "Really, to me it's really atrocious what they do to hip-hop in this country and what they do for the artists... I just feel like the token hip-hop artist from Canada. For urban music in this country, I mean, not only was hip-hop not televised, but also reggae and R&B; to me, it's sickening." Offishall also criticized the Juno Awards for having the American group The Black Eyed Peas perform at that year's ceremony. "I just had enough. They had me perform last night and give away the award — to me it's all a farce, I really can't put up with it anymore. It's not even that it's embarrassing, it's just disappointing. It doesn't matter what you do in this country, for me anyway, they don't recognize what I do. It's just a bunch of garbage so I won't be a part of it anymore." Despite this, Offishall performed at the 2021 and 2023 Juno Awards.

Juno Week
For several days prior to the weekend award presentations, events are held in the host city as part of a "Juno Week". Local venues host multiple events throughout the week. Events include: Juno Cup, an ice hockey game that pits a team of musicians against a team of National Hockey League players as a fundraiser for MusiCounts, a charitable music education program operated by CARAS, Juno Fan Fare, a meet and greet where fans can meet their favourite Canadian artists, Juno Songwriters' Circle, a chance for Canada's most talented songwriters to tell their stories and play an intimate set in support of MusiCounts, and JUNOfest, a music celebration that showcases local artists at various venues in the host city.

Juno TV
Launched in January 2013, Juno TV is a digital channel featuring original and archival content specific to the Juno Awards and its nominated artists and Canadian celebrities such as Alanis Morissette, The Weeknd, Lights, and Rush. Juno TV delivers new content weekly, presenting content on a year-round basis.

See also

 Canadian Country Music Association
 Music of Canada
 Canadian hip hop
 Canadian rock
 Canadian content
 :Category:Canadian rock music groups
 :Category:Canadian musical groups
 List of Canadian musicians
 :Category:Music festivals in Canada
 :Category:Canadian record labels

References

External links

 
 Juno Awards on CTV.ca
 Juno Awards Coverage on TheGATE.ca website
 CBC Digital Archives – And the Juno Went to…

 
Awards established in 1970
Canadian music awards